Namah Lakshmi Narayan (previously Namah) is an Indian-television mythological series that premiered on 23 September 2019 on Star Plus. Produced by Ved Raj under Shoonya Square Productions, it stars Savi Thakur, Vikkas Manaktala and Yukti Kapoor.

Initially it was titled Namah which focused on the friendship of Lord Vishnu and Lord Shiva. In October 2019, it was renamed as Namah Lakshmi Narayan which focused on Lord Vishnu and his wife Lakshmi.

Plot
Namah initially focused on the relationship between Lord Vishnu and Lord Shiva, two main deities of Hindu mythology and how their friendship is tested in Kali Yuga.

Later, it focused mainly on Lord Vishnu and Lakshmi and their eternal tale based on Vishnu Purana.

Cast

Main
Savi Thakur as 
Vishnu/Hari: Lakshmi's husband and Parvati's brother
Matsya: 1st Dashavatar of Vishnu
Kurma: 2nd Dashavatar of Vishnu
Hayagriva: 3rd Dashavatar of Vishnu
Yukti Kapoor in dual roles as 
Lakshmi/Matrikas/Shri: Vishnu's wife
Alakshmi: Lakshmi's sister
Vikkas Manaktala/Tarun Khanna as Shiva/Mahadev/Virabhadra/Dattatreya: Parvati's husband; Kartikeya, Ashokasundari and Ganesha's father
Chhavi Pandey/Rachana Parulkar as Parvati/Adi Parashakti/Shakti/Sati/Durga/Yogmaya/ Gauri: Vishnu's sister; Mahadev's wife; Kartikeya, Ashokasundari and Ganesha's mother

Recurring
Hemant Choudhary as Brahma: Narrator
 Raviz Thakur as Kali
 Zalak Desai as Saraswati
 Aaditya Bajpayee as Naagraj Vasuki Dev
 Siddharth Vasudev as Mahishasur
 Puneet Raj as Chandra
 Sachin Chauhan as Shani
 Shivendra Om Saainiyol as Nandi
 Sara Khan as Mrityu
 Shyam Mashalkar as Narada
 Samriddhi Yadav as Srishti
 Arjun Singh as Indra
 Sushant Marya as Varun
 Vikas Singh as Bhringi
 Ayan Kapoor as Agni
 Kajal Jain as Mohini
 Amit Behl as Daksha
 Rahul Ranaa as Bali
 Nadeem Ahmad Khan as Surya
 Abhishek Singh as Pawan
 Shivani Gupta as Varuni
 Payal Gupta as Neela
 Anand Dev as Himavan
 Shilpa Kataria Singh as Maina
 Gaurav Bakshi as Garuda
 Sharma Sanjeev Kumar as Samudra
 Aanjaali Rana as Vela
 Deepak Dutta as Manu
 Hemant Bharati as Madhu
 Ravi Chhabra as Kaitabha

Production

Development
It was originally planned as a weekend program but was later made as a weekday program shortly before the broadcast.

Approximately, ₹30 lakhs are spent per episode for production of this series. Also, 20 VFX agencies were brought in for this series.

In October 2019, the series was renamed from Namah to Namah Lakshmi Narayan, the new iteration focusing mainly on Lord Vishnu and Goddess Lakshmi and sidelining the story of Lord Shiva.

Speaking about the introduction of changes in the show, Ved Raj said, “We tried to blend mythology with fantasy, which hasn’t managed to strike a chord with the audience. Also, mythological shows mostly focus on just one God, but in our show, we tried to highlight the bond and friendship between Lord Shiva and Lord Vishnu. We have reworked the storyline and are focusing on Lord Vishnu (played by Savi Thakur). The track of Shiva will be reduced considerably, hence the decision to release Vikas. We decided to rope in Tarun, as has played Shiva earlier and wanted someone who will be instantly accepted by the audience".

Casting
Speaking about his training for his role as Shiva, Vikas Manaktala said, "Martial arts training and working out in the gym helped me get the desired physique for the role. To play Shiva, your expressions and attitude have to be calm. That was really difficult for me. I started meditating and that helped me get the right expressions for the role. Realized that maintaining a calm and composed demeanor on screen was the bigger challenge. To play Shiva, your expressions and attitude have to be calm. That was really difficult for me. I started meditating and that helped me get the right expressions for the role".

In order to increase the ratings of the show, makers introduced many changes in the storyline owing to which actors Vikas Manaktala, Chhavi Pandey and Sara Khan quit the show. Manaktala and Pandey were replaced by Tarun Khanna and Rachana Parulkar.

References

External links
 

StarPlus original programming
2019 Indian television series debuts
Indian television series about Hindu deities
2019 Indian television series endings